Malignant pilomatricoma is a cutaneous condition characterized by a locally aggressive tumor composed of hair-matrix cells.

See also 
 Pilomatricoma
 List of cutaneous conditions

References

External links 

Cutaneous congenital anomalies